Kim Hwang-Jung (Hangul: 김황정), or Terumasa Kin (金 晃正) (born 19 November 1975) is a former South Korean football player.

Club statistics

References

External links

1975 births
Living people
Hannan University alumni
Association football people from Osaka Prefecture
South Korean footballers
South Korean expatriate footballers
J1 League players
J2 League players
K League 1 players
JEF United Chiba players
Ventforet Kofu players
Ulsan Hyundai FC players
South Korean expatriate sportspeople in Japan
Expatriate footballers in Japan
Association football forwards